Cicely Englefield (29 June 1893–1970)  was a British artist known for writing and illustrating children's books.

Biography
Englefield was born in the Lee area of south London where her father was a solicitor and County Court Register. After attending Maidstone Grammar School and Blackheath High School, she studied at the St Martin's School of Art and the Central School of Arts and Crafts. After producing illustrations for children's annuals she began to illustrate her own children's books which were often about animal characters and natural history subjects. Throughout her career, Englefield often used wood engraving techniques and also created illustrations in watercolour, lithography and pen and ink drawings. She died at Poole, Dorset.

Published works
 George and Angela, 1932
 Katie the Caterpiller, 1933
 Billy Winks, 1934
 The Tale of a Guinea Pig, 1935
 A House for a Mouse, 1936
 Squishy Apples, 1937
 Bennie Black Lamb, 1938
 Connie the Cow, 1939
 Jeremy Jack, the Lazy Hare, 1940
 Burt the Sparrow, 1941
 Monty the Frog, 1941
 Feather the Foal, 1942
 The Tale of a Tadpole, 1945
 In Field and Hedgerow, 1948
 Scruffy the Little Black Hen, 1948
 Stories of an Old Grey Wall, 1958.

References

1893 births
1970 deaths
20th-century English women artists
Alumni of Saint Martin's School of Art
Alumni of the Central School of Art and Design
Artists from London
British children's writers
British illustrators
English children's book illustrators
People educated at Blackheath High School
People educated at Maidstone Grammar School 
People from Lee, London
Writers who illustrated their own writing